Kunduvadi is an unclassified Southern Dravidian language of India. It is structurally similar to Malayalam, but is closer to Pathiya.

References

Dravidian languages